Yisrael Bak (Hebrew: ישראל ב"ק)  (1797 Berdichev - November 1874, Jerusalem) (also called by the Yiddish surname Drucker, which means "printer") was a printer, a publisher and public figure in the Old Yishuv in the Land of Israel in the 19th century. He revived Hebrew printing in the Land of Israel after a hiatus of more than two hundred years and established the first Hebrew printing house in Jerusalem.

Safed and the Galilee
Yisrael Bak was born in Berdichev, Ukraine in 1797.  At the age of 19 he opened a Hebrew printing house, which operated for 9 years. He left Ukraine in 1831 to avoid the Russian cantonist draft for his son Nissan, and brought a printing press with him when he immigrated to the Land of Israel. He settled in Safed and established a printing house there. Bak was injured during the 1834 looting of Safed and had an enduring limp all his life. His precious printing press was badly damaged. He is said to have also practiced medicine, although he did not study it in an orderly manner, so that when the Egyptian governor of the country, Ibrahim Pasha, fell ill, Bak helped him in his recovery.

With the blessing of the governor, in 1834 Bak established a settlement and farm on Mount Jermak (today known by its ancient Hebrew name of Mount Meron). It was the first settlement established by Jewish immigrants in the modern era. Bak entrusted his son Nissan Bak with the management of the farm in Jermak.  For several years the farm was financially successful, and according to the testimony of missionaries from 1839, about 15 people lived in it.

The earthquake in Safed in 1837 and government change in the Land of Israel in 1840, following the Egyptian–Ottoman War (1839–1841), in which Ibrahim Pasha was removed, led to the end of the Jewish settlement in Jermak. Remnants of the buildings and plantations can still be found there today, and it is known as Khirbet Bak (Bak's Ruin). The earthquake also destroyed what was left of Bak's printing house in Safed.

Jerusalem
After the destruction of the agricultural farm in Jermak, and the printing house in Safed, Bak left the Galilee and moved to Jerusalem. A year later, in 1841, he established the first Hebrew printing house in Jerusalem, preceded only by the printing house of the Armenian community (Armenians in Israel), founded about a decade earlier. In 1843, Sir Moses Montefiore, who had known Bak in Safed, gave Bak a new printing press called "Moshe and Yehudit", named after Montefiore and his wife Judith .

In Jerusalem, Bak joined the Hasidic community and was active in establishing the Hasidic Tiferet Yisrael Synagogue in the Jewish Quarter of the Old City.

As the sole printer in Jerusalem, Bak held a monopoly on Hebrew printing in the city.

In 1863 Bak began to publish the “Havazeleth” newspaper, with his son-in-law Israel Dov Frumkin. It was published (intermittently) for more than forty years.

Surname meaning
According to one family tradition, the surname Bak is the initials "Baal Koreh" בעל קורא (Reader), a position that the father of the family, Rabbi Avraham Bak, held in the synagogue of Rabbi Levi Yitzchak of Berditchev. Another tradition claims that the origin of the name is an abbreviation of "Ben Kedoshim" בן קדושים (Son of Martyrs) is from the name of one of the ancestors of the family who was killed for Kiddush Hashem (Martyrdom in Judaism).

Literature
 Me'ir Benayahu, "בית דפוסו של ר ישראל ב"ק בצפת וראשית הדפוס בירושלים" (Rabbi Yisrael Bak's Printing House in Safed, and the Beginning of Printing in Jerusalem)
 Abraham Ya'ari, "זכרונות ארץ ישראל, כרך א': י', ישוב חקלאי ראשון של עולים בגליל העליון, ר' ישראל ב"ק, 1837–1839." (Memories of the Land of Israel I: The First Agricultural Settlement of Immigrants in the Upper Galilee, Rabbi Yisrael Bak, 1837–1839)
 Getzl Karsal, "לקסיקון הספרות העברית בדורות האחרונים (כרך א, עמ' 305–306, בערכו), בהוצאת ספרית פועלים 1965–1967" (Lexicon of Hebrew Literature in Recent Generations (Bd, S. 305–306))
 Saev Aner, "סיפורי משפחות, תל אביב: משרד הביטחון - ההוצאה לאור, 1990, עמ' 65–72" (Family Stories, Tel Aviv: Ministry of Defense, 1990, S. 65–72.)
 Arieh Morgenstern, "'בית הדפוס של ישראל בק בצפת – גילויים חדשים', על ספרים ואנשים 9 (תשנ"ה), 6–7" (Yisrael Bak's Printing House in Safed - new revelations, About Books and People 9 (1994), 6–7)

References

1797 births
1874 deaths
Old Yishuv
Ashkenazi Jews in Ottoman Palestine
Ottoman Hasidim
People from Berdichevsky Uyezd
Ottoman Palestine

he:ישראל ב"ק
he:אברהם בן יצחק אשכנזי
he:אנציקלופדיה לחלוצי הישוב ובוניו